This is a list of notable Chinese Indonesians:

Academics
 Arief Budiman (史福仁), sociologist, professor, University of Melbourne, formerly at Satya Wacana Christian University, brother of Soe Hok Gie.
 Hadi Soesastro (陳余明), economist, political scientist (international relations), founder and former Executive Director of Centre for Strategic and International Studies (Indonesia).
 Jusuf Wanandi (林綿基/林绵基), political scientist (international relations).
 Leo Suryadinata (廖建裕), sinologist.
 Ong Hok Ham (王福涵), historian.
 Mely G. Tan (陳玉蘭/陈玉兰), Indonesian sociologist.
 Merlyna Lim, professor & Canada Research Chair in Digital Media and Global Network Society.
 Soe Tjen Marching (史曾), feminist academic, composer, writer.

Activists
 Aw Tjoei Lan, anti-human trafficking activist and founder of the charity organization Ati Soetji.
 Lie Eng Hok, Indonesian independence activist and political prisoner, was declared a Pioneer of Independence in 1959.
 Phoa Keng Hek 'Sia' (潘景赫舍), honorific "Sia"(Hokien dialect), community leader, social activist and founding president of Tiong Hoa Hwe Koan.
 Soe Hok Gie (史朱義/史福义), political analyst and activist in the 1960s.
 Thung Sin Nio (汤新娘)(Betsy), women's rights activist and physician.
 Yap Yun Hap, activist who died in Semanggi tragedy
 Yap Thiam Hien (葉添興/叶添兴), Hakka Chinese human rights activist, public defender.

Architect
 Liem Bwan Tjie, pioneering figure of modern Indonesian architecture.

Entertainers
 Abimana Aryasatya actor.
 Agnez Mo (楊詩曼), singer-songwriter, record producer, composer, actress, presenter, rapper, author, businesswoman, dancer, model, philanthropist.
 Anthony Xie (謝健忠), actor.
 Ateng (邱诚烈), comedian.
 Baim Wong, actor.
 Boy William, actor.
 Chelsea Olivia Wijaya, actress, model.
 Chrisye, singer.
 Daniel Mananta, presenter, model, fashion designer.
 Deddy Corbuzier, presenter, magician.
 Dion Wiyoko, presenter, actor.
 Ernest Prakasa, comedian.
 Gisella Anastasia, actress, singer, model.
 Goh Soon Tioe (吳順籌), conductor, pedagogue, violinist
 Heaven Tanudiredja, fashion designer.
 Jahja Ling (林望傑), conductor, music director.
 Jaya Suprana (潘郭蒋), businessman, head of Jamu Jago, comedian, linguist, composer, musician, TV talk.
 Jim Adhi Limas, also known as Jim Lim LD, pioneer of the Indonesian modern theatre 1970's, director, actor, movie critics  journalist, theater-play translator. One of the founders of the theater company: Studiklub Teater Bandung (STB) -1960.
 Joe Taslim, actor, model, martial artist.
 Julie Estelle, actress, model.
 Kevin Liliana, actress, model.
 Leila Tong (江麗娜), actress.
 Lo Lieh (羅烈), actor.
 Mariana Renata, actress, model.
 Melvis, Hong Kong Elvis impersonator.
 Morgan Oey, actor, singer.
 Nadine Chandrawinata, actress, model, contestant Puteri Indonesia 2005. (half-German)
 Nathan Hartono, singer.
 Rich Brian, rapper, singer, record producer, songwriter.
 Sandra Angelia, presenter, model.
 Sandra Dewi, actress, presenter.
 Saridjah Niung, also known as Ibu Sud, musician, teacher, radio announcer, playwright and batik artist.
 Sisca Kohl, internet celebrity.
 Tan Tjoei Hock Journalist, director.
 Teguh Karya (林廉鹤), director.
 The Teng Chun (鄭丁春), director.
 Vania Larissa, singer.
 Willy Dozan (庄陈力), actor, martial artist.
 Warren Hue, rapper, singer, record producer, songwriter.
 Wim Umboh, director.
 Wong Brothers (Nelson, Joshua, and Othniel Wong), directors.
 Wolly Sutinah, senior actress.

Authors
 Clara Ng, short story writer, novelist.
 Khoe Trima Nio short story writer and novelist
 Kwee Kek Beng (郭克明), journalist and writer.
 Kwee Tek Hoay (郭德懷), writer of novels and drama, important proponent of Tri-Dharma and credited with the publication of Dharma Moestika (1932–1934) and a list of publications
 Lie Kim Hok (李金福), teacher and writer who authored Tjhit Liap Seng and Malajoe Batawi.
 Lie Loan Lian Nio (李來莲娘), 1920s translator of Chinese novels into Malay
 Lie Sim Djwe, translator and novelist
 Marga T (蔡良珠), novelist.
 Mira W., novelist.
 Myra Sidharta (欧阳春梅), writer and academic.
 Nio Joe Lan (梁友兰), writer, journalist, and history teacher.
 Oen Tjhing Tiauw writer, playwright, cultural activist and politician
 Tan Boen Soan (陈文宣), writer and journalist.
 Tan Gin Ho, writer and scion of the influential Tan family of Cirebon.
 Tan Hong Boen, writer and translator active before and after World War II
 Tan Tjeng Nio author of a book of Syair poems published in 1897
 Thé Tjong-Khing (鄭宗瓊), Dutch children's book artist, author.
 Nyonya The Tiang Ek, writer, journalist and translator
 The Liep Nio 1930s writer
 Thio Tjin Boen (張振文), journalist and writer who authored Tjerita Oeij Se.
 Tio Ie Soei (赵雨水), writer and journalist who authored Sie Po Giok.

Beauty queens
 Imelda Fransisca, contestant Miss Indonesia 2005, runner up Miss ASEAN 2005.
 Sandra Angelia, contestant Miss Indonesia 2008.
 Karenina Sunny Halim, contestant Miss Indonesia 2009. (half-American)
 Maria Selena, contestant Miss Universe Indonesia 2011.
 Astrid Ellena, contestants Miss Indonesia 2011, top 15 finalist Miss World 2011.
 Patricia Gunawan, top 15 finalist Miss Indonesia 2012, runner-up Miss ASEAN 2012, runner-up Asia's Next Top Model (cycle 4).
 Vania Larissa, contestant Miss Indonesia 2013, top 10 finalist Miss World 2013.
 Ayu Gani, winner Asia's Next Top Model (cycle 3).
 Kezia Warouw, contestant Miss Universe Indonesia 2016. top 13 finalist Miss Universe 2016.
 Natasha Mannuela Halim, contestant Miss Indonesia 2016, 2nd runner-up Miss World 2016.
 Kevin Lilliana, contestant Miss Indonesia International 2017, winner Miss International 2017. (half Sundanese)
 Sonia Fergina Citra, contestant Miss Universe Indonesia 2018, top 10 finalist Miss Oriental Tourism 2012, contestant Miss Universe 2018.

Businesspeople
 Carlo Tabalujan (譚欣下), founder PT Nestle Indonesia, Danmotor Vespa, Kawasaki Motor Indonesia.
 Ciputra (徐振煥), philanthropist, founder Ciputra Development, Forbes 23rd richest Indonesian.
 Hary Tanoesoedibjo, founder MNC Group, founder Perindo party..
 Leo KoGuan (廖凯原), founder of SHI International Corp, third largest shareholder in Tesla, Inc.
 Michael Bambang Hartono, founder Djarum and owner of BCA.
 Mochtar Riady (李文正), founder Lippo Group.
 Cherie Nursalim (林美金), Vice Chairman of Giti Corporation
 Khouw Khe Hien, pioneering aviator.
 Kimun Ongkosandjojo (王金溫), co-founder Jamu Air Mancur.
 Prajogo Pangestu (彭雲鵬), business magnate, investor, philanthropist.
 Robert Budi Hartono (黃惠忠), founder Djarum and owner of BCA.
 Sofjan Wanandi (林綿坤), owner Gemala Group, former leader of Indonesian Employers Association (Apindo) 2008-2013.
 Liem Sioe Liong (林紹良), founder Salim Group, BCA.
 Sutanto Djuhar (林文镜), co-founder Salim Group.
 Sukanto Tanoto (陳江和), founder Raja Garuda Mas International (now Royal Golden Eagle).
 Tahir (翁俊民), founder, Mayapada Bank.
 Tan Khoen Swie (陳坤瑞), publisher.
 Yap Goan Ho nineteenth century translator and publisher
 Teddy Yip (叶德利), founder Macau Grand Prix.
 William Soeryadjaya (謝建隆), founder Astra International.

Criminals
 Oey Tamba Sia (黃陶謝), playboy, tycoon's heir and criminal.
 Eddy Tansil, A Corruptor Who Run Away From Indonesia

Economists
 Christianto Wibisono (黃建國), economics analyst.
 Thee Kian Wie (戴建偉), Indonesian economic historian, founder LIPI.

Journalists
 Ang Jan Goan (洪渊源), journalist, publisher and political thinker, director of Sin Po (1925-1959).
 Auw Jong Peng Koen (欧阳炳昆), co-founder Kompas.
 Hauw Tek Kong (侯德廣), newspaper editor and founder of Keng Po.
 Lauw Giok Lan (劉玉蘭), journalist, writer and one of the founders of the newspaper Sin Po.
 Phoa Tjoen Hoat, journalist and editor of Perniagaan, Warna Warta and Sinar Sumatra
 Phoa Tjoen Hoay, journalist and translator 
 Siem Piet Nio, (沈泌娘) early feminist writer and journalist who wrote under the pen name Hong Le Hoa for Panorama and other magazines

Military personnel
 Djoni Liem (林王小), a retired Indonesian Navy, He is one of the figures in Dwikora Operation.
 John Lie (李約翰), a National Hero who served the Indonesian Navy by setting up clandestine weapons procurement operations during the Dutch blockades from 1947 to 1949, continued serving the Navy during the 1961–1963 Mandala campaigns before retiring as Rear Admiral.
 Teddy Jusuf (熊德怡), first Chinese-Indonesian to attain the rank of Brigadier General on the Indonesian Army.
 Kyai Ronggo Ngabehi Soero Pernollo (韓錢江), Chinese-javanese nobleman, police chief, bureaucrat and founder of the Muslim branch of the Han family of Lasem.

Politicians
 Abdurrahman Wahid, the 4th President of Indonesia.
 Alvin Lie (Lie Ling Piauw, 李寧彪), Member of Parliament, PAN.
 Han Bwee Kong, Kapitein der Chinezen, magnate, government official, and a landlord in East Java, part of the Han family of Lasem.
 Han Tiauw Tjong Sia, prominent colonial Indonesian politician, engineer, community leader and a member of the influential Han family of Lasem.
 Bob Hasan (The Kian Seng), former Minister of Forestry.
 Basuki Tjahaja Purnama (Tjoeng Wan Hok, 鍾萬學), Hakka descent, former Governor of Jakarta.
 Christiandy Sanjaya (Bong Hon San, 黃漢山), Hakka descent, Vice Governor of West Kalimantan; Indonesia's first Chinese deputy governor.
 Charles Honoris, Member of House of Representatives, Indonesian Democratic Party - Struggle.
 Enggartiasto Lukita (Loe Joe Eng, 呂有恩), former Minister of Trade.
 Hok Hoei Kan (簡福輝舍), colonial politician, landlord, patrician and founding president of Chung Hwa Hui.
 Jusuf Wanandi (Liem Bian Kie, 林基綿), former student activist in 1960s; former representative in the People’s Consultative Assembly.
 Khouw Kim An (許金安), fifth and last Majoor der Chinezen ("Major of the Chinese") of Batavia (1910-1918).
 Kwik Kian Gie (郭建義/郭建义), Coordinating Minister of Economics and Finance, 1999–2000; Minister of National Development Planning, 2001–2004. 
 Liem Koen Hian, journalist, politicians.
 Lie Tjoe Hong (李子鳳), third Majoor der Chinezen ("Major of the Chinese") of Batavia (1879-1896).
 Loa Sek Hie Sia, colonial politician, community leader, landlord, patrician, and founder of Pao An Tui.
 Mari Pangestu (Phang Hoei Lan, 馮慧蘭/冯慧兰), Minister of Trade, 2004–2011; Minister of Tourism and Creative Economy, 2011–2014.
 Phoa Liong Gie (潘隆義舍/潘隆义舍), colonial politician, jurist, newspaper owner.
 Susanto (Lin Guanyu), Member of Parliament, PBI, 1999.
 Tan Eng Goan (陳永元), first Majoor der Chinezen ("Major of the Chinese") of Batavia (1837–1865).
Tan Tjoen Tiat (陳濬哲), second Majoor der Chinezen ("Major of the Chinese") of Batavia (1865-1879).
 Thio Thiam Tjong (张添聪), politician and community leader, founding board member of Chung Hwa Hui.
 Tio Tek Ho (趙德和), fourth Majoor der Chinezen ("Major of the Chinese") of Batavia (1896-1907).
 Yenny Wahid, Member of Parliament.
 Ignasius Jonan, Current Minister of Energy and Mineral Resources and former CEO of Indonesian Railways Company.

Sportspeople
 Abraham Damar Grahita, basketball player.
 Agassi Goantara, basketball player.
 Agus Indra Kurniawan, football player.
 Alan Budikusuma (Goei Djien Hong, 魏仁芳), badminton star and 1992 Olympic gold medalist.
 Angelique Widjaja (黄依林), tennis athlete.
 Antonius Ariantho, badminton star.
 Arthur Irawan, football player.
 Candra Wijaya (陳甲亮), badminton star and 2000 Olympic gold medalist with Tony Gunawan for men's doubles.
 Chris John, boxing world champion (WBA featherweight, 2003–present).
 Christian Hadinata (紀明發), badminton star.
 Daniel Marthin, badminton player.
 Daniel Wenas, basketball player.
 Daud Yordan, boxing world champion (IBO featherweight, 2012–present).
 Debby Susanto, badminton star.
 Denny Kantono, badminton star.
 Denny Sumargo, basketball star.
 Eddy Hartono (洪忠中), badminton star.
 Eddy Kurniawan (罗天宁), badminton star.
 Edhi Handoko, chess grandmaster.
 Elkan Baggott
 Eng Hian (徐永賢/徐永贤), badminton star.
 Endang Witarsa (Liem Soen Joe, 林順有), football manager.
 Febby Valencia Dwijayanti Gani, badminton player.
 Ferry Sonneville, badminton star.
 Halim Haryanto, badminton star.
 Hendra Setiawan, badminton star.
 Hendrawan (葉誠萬), badminton world champion.
 Hermawan Susanto (蔡祥林), badminton star.
 Herry Iman Pierngadi (彭伟信), badminton coach.
 Hiong Liong Tan (陈香良), chess master.
 Huang Hua (黄华), badminton star of China, later become a citizen of Indonesia.
 Ignatius Surya (簡頹), part of squad Indonesia 2021 Balloon World Cup.
 Inesh Putri Chandra, professional golfer.
 Johan Wahjudi (洪耀龍), badminton star.
 John Juanda, poker player, fulltiltpoker star.
 Juan Revi, football player.
 Jonatan Christie, badminton star.
 Justinus Lhaksana, former Indonesia futsal coach.
 Kim Kurniawan, football player.
 Kevin Sanjaya Sukamuljo, badminton star.
 Khouw Keng Nio, first woman aviator in China and Indonesia (qualified in March 1936).
 Kwee Kiat Sek, football player, part of squad Indonesia in 1956 Olympic in Melbourne.
 Liang Qiuxia (梁秋霞), badminton star of China, later become a citizen of Indonesia and Indonesian coach.
 Liem Swie King (林水鏡), badminton player.
 Liliyana Natsir, badminton star and 2016 Olympic gold medalist with Tontowi Ahmad for Mixed doubles.
 Marcus Fernaldi Gideon, badminton star.
 Maria Selena, basketball player.
 Mei Joni, basketball player.
 Muljadi (翁振祥), badminton player.
 Ng Ka Long, badminton player representing Hong Kong.
 Nova Arianto, football player.
 Praveen Jordan, badminton star.
 Ricardo Moniz
 Rio Haryanto, Indonesian racer on Formula One for Manor Racing F1 Team in 2016 Formula One season.
 Ronald Susilo (林香文), badminton star based in Singapore.
 Ruben Gunawan, chess grandmaster.
 Rudy Hartono (梁海量), badminton player, 8-time winner of the All-England Cup.
 Sean Gelael, racing driver.
 Simon Santoso, badminton player.
 Surya Lesmana, football player.
 Susi Susanti (Ong Lien Hiang, 王蓮香), Hakka descent, badminton star and 1992 Olympic gold medalist.
 Sutanto Tan, football player.
 Tan Hong Djien, football player, play in the 1938 FIFA World Cup.
 Tan Joe Hok (陳有福), Indonesia badminton player.
 Tan Liong Houw, football player, part of squad Indonesia in 1956 Olympic in Melbourne.
 Tan Mo Heng, football goalkeeper, play in the 1938 FIFA World Cup.
 Tan See Han, football players, play in 1938 FIFA World Cup.
 Tjun Tjun (梁春生), badminton star.
 Tony Gunawan (吳俊明), badminton star and 2000 Olympic gold medalist with Candra Wijaya for men's doubles.
 Verawaty Fadjrin, badminton star.
 Vincent Rivaldi Kosasih, basketball player.
 Wong Wing Ki, badminton player representing Hong Kong.
 Wynne Prakusya, tennis athlete.

See also
 Chen Fu Zhen Ren
 Chinese Indonesians
 Benteng Chinese
 Chinese in the Bangka Belitung Islands
 Supreme Council for the Confucian Religion in Indonesia
 Kong Koan & Tiong Hoa Hwee Koan
 Kapitan Cina & List of Kapitan Cina
 Sia (title)
 Discrimination against Chinese Indonesians
 Legislation on Chinese Indonesians
 1740 Batavia massacre
 1918 Kudus riot
 Jakarta Riots of May 1998
 List of Javanese people
 List of Acehnese people
 List of Batak people
 List of Bugis people
 List of Minangkabaus
 List of Moluccan people
 List of Sundanese people

References

Bibliography

List
Chinese descent
Chinese